Vanessa Maria van Arendonk (born 22 November 1980 in Curaçao) is a beauty pageant titleholder who won Miss Curaçao 2003 and competed in Miss Universe 2003, held in Panama.  She was the first Miss Curaçao to have the two most important beauty queen titles of the island under her name: Miss International Curaçao (2001) and Miss Curaçao Universe (2003).

Van Arendonk graduated from Manhattanville College in Purchase, New York.

References

External links
 Miss Universe 2003 contestants

1980 births
Curaçao beauty pageant winners
Living people
Manhattanville College alumni
Miss International 2001 delegates
Miss Universe 2003 contestants